The Douglas, Arizona Port of Entry is a port of entry on the Mexico–United States border. It connects Douglas, Arizona with Agua Prieta, Sonora. It is near the southern terminus of U.S. Route 191 in Arizona and the northern terminus of Mexican Federal Highway 17, which connect the towns of Douglas and Agua Prieta to their respective national highway networks.

It has been in existence since about 1914. The current border inspection station was built in 1933, was significantly renovated and expanded by the General Services Administration in 1993, and was listed on the U.S. National Register of Historic Places in 2014.  The crossing is open 24 hours per day, 7 days per week.  In 2015, this facility was renamed the "Raul Hector Castro Port of Entry", after former Arizona Governor Raúl Héctor Castro.

See also
 List of Mexico–United States border crossings

References

Mexico–United States border crossings
National Register of Historic Places in Cochise County, Arizona
Government buildings on the National Register of Historic Places in Arizona
1914 establishments in Arizona
Buildings and structures completed in 1914
Buildings and structures in Cochise County, Arizona